Hafizpet railway station or Hafeezpet railway station is a railway station in Hyderabad, Telangana, India. Localities like Madhapur, Izzat Nagar, Kondapur and Miyapur are accessible from this station.

Lines
Hyderabad Multi-Modal Transport System

MMTS stations in Hyderabad
Secunderabad railway division